Poppy Field is a 1890 painting by the Dutch artist Vincent van Gogh. It has been described as "a composition that verges on the abstract" and shows marked difference from a 1888 painting of the same subject that now is in the Van Gogh Museum, in Amsterdam.

The painting hangs in the Kunstmuseum, in The Hague. It was restored to Dutch ownership after being taken by the Nazis during the Second World War; the Kunstmuseum expects that it will be restored to its original private owners.

References

1890 paintings
Paintings by Vincent van Gogh
Collections of the Kunstmuseum, The Hague